Gruzdžiai Manor was a former residential manor in Gruzdžiai, Šiauliai County, Lithuania. Currently it is used as a Gruzdžiai Agricultural School.

References

Manor houses in Lithuania
Buildings and structures in Šiauliai County